is Maki Goto's 17th single. It was released on April 11, 2007 in both regular (PKCP-5084) and first press (PKCP-5082～3) editions. The Single V DVD was released two weeks later, on April 25, 2007 with the catalog number PKBP-5071.

The c/w of this single, Inner Child, is used in the Showa Era song theater play Yokosuka Story.

Track listing

Charts and sales

Oricon

 Total sales: 14,861

Release history

References

External links
 Up-Front Works discography entries: CD, DVD

2007 singles
Songs written by Tsunku
Maki Goto songs
2007 songs
Song recordings produced by Tsunku